Adetayo Oluwatosin Olusegun Adio Aduramigba Iretioluwa Edun (born 14 May 1998) is an English professional footballer who plays as a left back or midfielder for  side Blackburn Rovers.

Early life
Edun was born in Islington, London to a mother from Saint Vincent and the Grenadines and a father from Nigeria, attending Enfield Grammar School.

Club career

Fulham
On 9 August 2016, Edun made his professional debut in a League Cup match against Leyton Orient.

Ipswich Town (loan)
On 3 August 2018, Edun, sign for Ipswich Town on a season-loan from Fulham. He scored on his debut for the club in a 2–2 draw against Blackburn Rovers on 4 August 2018. He was recalled by Fulham on 31 December 2018 due to an eye injury, ending his loan stay early after making just 6 appearances.

Lincoln City
After leaving Fulham, Edun signed a -year contract with League One club Lincoln City on 10 January 2020. He would score his first goal for the club against Liverpool in the third round of the EFL Cup on 24 September 2020.

Blackburn Rovers
On 31 August 2021, Edun would join EFL Championship side Blackburn Rovers.

International career
Edun was born in England and is of St Vincent and Nigerian descent. He has represented England at Under 17, Under 18, Under 19 and Under 20 level.

Edun was selected to represent England under-17 at the 2015 UEFA European Under-17 Championship and 2015 FIFA U-17 World Cup.

Edun was included in the England under-19 squad for the 2017 UEFA European Under-19 Championship. He was sent off in the final after receiving two yellow cards, however England held on to defeat Portugal. Edun was subsequently included in the team of the tournament.

Career statistics

Honours
England U19
UEFA European Under-19 Championship: 2017

Individual
UEFA European Under-19 Championship Team of the Tournament: 2017

References

External links
England profile at The FA

1998 births
Living people
English footballers
Fulham F.C. players
Ipswich Town F.C. players
Lincoln City F.C. players
Blackburn Rovers F.C. players
Association football midfielders
Footballers from Islington (district)
England youth international footballers
English people of Nigerian descent
English people of Saint Vincent and the Grenadines descent
Black British sportspeople
English Football League players
English people of Yoruba descent
Yoruba sportspeople